Motherwell railway station serves Motherwell in North Lanarkshire, Scotland. It lies on the West Coast Main Line (WCML), and is served also by Argyle Line trains of the Glasgow suburban railway network. It is the penultimate stop on the northbound WCML before Glasgow. There are four platforms of various length in use at Motherwell. The station is located next to the town's main shopping arcade, Motherwell Shopping Centre.

History

The first station in Motherwell was opened by the Wishaw and Coltness Railway on 8 May 1843 and was located at Orbiston. As Orbiston station was quite some distance from the rapidly expanding Motherwell town centre, the decision was taken by the Caledonian Railway to build a station at 'Lesmahagow Junction', the point where the Motherwell Deviation branch of the Caledonian Railway Main Line met the lines to Mossend, Hamilton and Lesmahagow. That Motherwell station was opened on 31 July 1885 on a site conveniently in the heart of the town which replaced the original station.

The current station was built by British Rail during the 1970s (on the same site) to coincide with the completion of electrification of the West Coast Main Line from Carlisle to Glasgow which was completed in 1974. It has four through platforms, crossed by two overbridges with the main buildings being above the level of the line between Platforms 2 and 3. At platform level between Platforms 2 and 3 there is also an ScotRail traincrew depot, staff car park and an office of the British Transport Police. These are accessible via a gated rampway leading to street level.

Beyond Platform 4 are some electrified sidings used for the stabling of trains overnight. Diagrams are nominally worked so that these units will only stay at Motherwell for one night before returning to their allocated depot.

Services

There is one train per hour to Edinburgh Waverley via Shotts.

TransPennine Express provides a 2 hourly service to both Glasgow Central and Manchester Airport. On weekends there is a limited service to Liverpool Lime Street (one every Saturday, two every Sunday).

Avanti West Coast provide 6 trains per day northbound to Glasgow Central (1 of which is set down only) and 9 trains per day southbound, 8 of these go to London Euston while the last one terminates at Crewe.

London North Eastern provide 1 train per day to Motherwell between Glasgow Central and London King's Cross.

Motherwell is unusual in that Glasgow Central can be reached via trains from three different platforms going in two different directions. Glasgow is generally north-west of Motherwell, but trains can depart via the West Coast Main Line  in the Motherwell deviation going north, or by the Hamilton Circle going south. The same can also be said for services to Lanark, which is south-east of Motherwell. Trains can depart towards Lanark going south via Shieldmuir, or initially north via Holytown (though this route is not normally used for timetabled trains since the December 2014 timetable alterations were implemented).

Trains provided by London North Eastern Railway will generally be suspended in this event as their drivers do not have the required route knowledge. In general, a replacement bus service will operate from Motherwell, and passengers from Glasgow are advised to travel to Edinburgh via Glasgow Queen Street.

Platforms

Platform 1 is used for all southbound InterCity services as well as local services to Carstairs and Edinburgh. Services to Lanark use this platform every half hour. Lanark departures from this platform travel via Shieldmuir.
Platform 2 is used for all northbound InterCity services to Glasgow Central as well as local northbound services to Glasgow Central from Edinburgh and Carstairs. Services from Lanark to Glasgow Central via  also use this platform.
Platform 3 is used by  services  to Glasgow Central via Hamilton. Services on the Hamilton Circle line to Glasgow which have arrived via Whifflet also use this platform. One train a day from Edinburgh via Shotts terminates here. In addition on Sundays, trains from Motherwell to Glasgow Central via Bellshill use this platform.
Platform 4 is used by all services on the Hamilton Circle to Glasgow which have arrived via Hamilton, as well as those terminating here to return via Hamilton. Also trains to Cumbernauld use this platform hourly.

References

External links

Railway stations in North Lanarkshire
Former Caledonian Railway stations
Railway stations in Great Britain opened in 1885
Railway stations served by ScotRail
Railway stations served by Caledonian Sleeper
Railway stations served by CrossCountry
SPT railway stations
Railway stations served by TransPennine Express
Railway stations served by Avanti West Coast
Railway stations served by London North Eastern Railway
Buildings and structures in Motherwell
Stations on the West Coast Main Line